Brian Jones (born April 22, 1994) is a former professional Canadian football wide receiver and is the special teams coordinator for the York Lions of U Sports football. He played professionally for the Toronto Argonauts, Saskatchewan Roughriders, and Hamilton Tiger-Cats of the Canadian Football League (CFL).  He played Canadian Interuniversity Sport (CIS) football with the Acadia Axemen.

University career
Jones played for the Acadia Axemen football team from 2013 to 2016. He was named the Atlantic University Sport Most Valuable Player in 2014 and a CIS Second team All-Star in 2015. In the CFL's Amateur Scouting Bureau final rankings, he was ranked as the tenth best of the players eligible in the 2016 CFL Draft.

Professional career

Toronto Argonauts
Jones was drafted fourth overall by the Toronto Argonauts in the 2016 CFL Draft and signed with the team on May 29, 2016. He dressed for 12 games for the Argonauts in 2016, his rookie season, and started four. He made 12 receptions for 128 yards and a touchdown. He dressed in nine games in 2017 and three in 2018, but didn't record any receptions.

Saskatchewan Roughriders
On August 20, 2018, he was traded to the Saskatchewan Roughriders for a seventh-round pick in the 2019 CFL Draft. There, he dressed in 10 games and recorded two receptions for 20 yards. He became a free agent on February 12, 2019.

Hamilton Tiger-Cats
Jones signed with the Hamilton Tiger-Cats on the first day of free agency on February 12, 2019. He played in the first two games of the season for the Tiger-Cats, but was released on June 26, 2019. He was re-signed by the Tiger-Cats on August 6, 2019. He re-signed with the team again on February 10, 2021. He was released on June 28, 2021.

Toronto Argonauts
On October 26, 2021, it was announced that Jones had re-signed with the Toronto Argonauts. He played in the last regular season game for the Argonauts in 2021 and his practice roster contract expired on December 6, 2021.

Coaching career
Jones was hired as the special teams coordinator for the York Lions for the 2022 season.

References

External links
York Lions bio

1994 births
Living people
Canadian football wide receivers
Acadia Axemen football players
Sportspeople from Nova Scotia
Toronto Argonauts players
Saskatchewan Roughriders players
Hamilton Tiger-Cats players
Players of Canadian football from Nova Scotia
York Lions football coaches